Solser en Hesse (English: Solser and Hesse) was a short Dutch silent film by M.H. Laddé and J.W. Merkelbach from 1900, featuring the comedians Lion Solser and Piet Hesse. the film was first distributed in the Netherlands by 'Edison's Ideal' in 1900, and second film starring the two men and under the same name was released in 1906 by 'The Royal Bioscope'.  Both films are lost.

See also 
 List of Dutch films before 1910

Sources 
 Wereldkroniek, October 1936, pp. 1662–63

External links 
Solser en Hesse, EYE Film Institute Netherlands

1900 films
Dutch black-and-white films
Dutch silent short films
Lost Dutch films
1900s lost films